Grammer may refer to:

Grammer (surname), people with the surname
Grammer, Indiana, a small town in the United States
 A common misspelling of grammar

See also
 Grammar (disambiguation)